The 1997 Waldbaum's Hamlet Cup was a men's tennis tournament played on Hard courts in Long Island, United States that was part of the International Series of the 1997 ATP Tour. It was the seventeenth edition of the tournament and was held from 18–24 August 1998.

Seeds
Champion seeds are indicated in bold text while text in italics indicates the round in which those seeds were eliminated.

Draw

Finals

Top half

Bottom half

References

Waldbaum's Hamlet Cup
Connecticut Open (tennis)
1997 Waldbaum's Hamlet Cup